Chandan Singh (born 8 June 1987) is an Indian racewalker who competes in the 20 kilometres and 20 kilometres walk events.

Competition record

External links

1987 births
Living people
Indian male racewalkers
World Athletics Championships athletes for India
Place of birth missing (living people)